Gunfight At Carnegie Hall is the final album by Phil Ochs released during his lifetime, comprising songs recorded at the infamous, gold-suited, bomb-threat shortened first show at Carnegie Hall in New York City on March 27, 1970, though it contains less than half of the actual concert. The shows recorded that day served to surprise Ochs' fans, from his gold lamé Nudie suit, modeled after Elvis Presley's, to his covers of Presley, Conway Twitty, Buddy Holly and Merle Haggard songs, to his own re-arranged songs.  Some fans loved it, but some attendees at the show were unhappy with the music he was playing, wanting only to hear "old" Ochs. Before he had a chance to convince them, the concert was cut short by a telephoned bomb threat.

Some angry fans who had paid for a full concert confronted Phil at dinner between shows. He took their names, promising to get them into the second show for free, but the box office was locked and Ochs smashed the glass, severely cutting his thumb. He appeared onstage at the second show with a bandaged hand, telling the audience the story. Breaking into the lockbox was the last straw. While they let Ochs perform the second show, he was banned immediately afterwards from performing again at the venue.

On the Gunfight album, before performing a medley of Buddy Holly songs, Ochs describes Holly's influence on the songs for which he would become famous, such as "I Ain't Marching Anymore".  Ochs says that Holly's songs were "just as much Phil Ochs as anything else".  When some of the audience shout and boo, Ochs admonishes them to "not be like Spiro Agnew", saying that their prejudice against certain forms of music was bigotry: "You can be a bigot from all sides.  You can be a bigot against blacks; you can be a bigot against music". Many in the audience cheer at this sentiment.

The second show, which started at midnight, went on for more than three hours. When Carnegie Hall cut the power to the microphones in the middle of Ochs' performing a medley of Elvis songs, he shouted out and the remaining audience started chanting "We want power!" until the microphones  were turned back on. (Although the Gunfight album is composed of performances from the first show, the chant from the second show is included.)  Many loyal fans remained to the very end of the concert, cheering and dancing, enjoying this chance to share what many felt was an historic moment with Ochs.

Ochs begged his record label, A&M, to release an album of his Carnegie Hall performances in late 1970. They refused, and the tapes languished for four years in the vaults until the label relented, releasing fifty minutes of material, mostly the cover versions (four of sixteen originals performed were released, compared to five of seven covers). The album was only released in Canada and Japan; it was not released in the United States until Mobile Fidelity Sound Lab issued it on compact disc in the late 1980s. There is no talk of a complete release of either show, although an acoustic version of "Crucifixion" was released on the 1976 compilation Chords Of Fame and the 1997 box set Farewells & Fantasies and an additional cover, Chuck Berry's "School Days", appeared on the 1997 British anthology, American Troubadour.  Copies of the entire second show are known to be traded among fans. Ochs had been drinking between shows, and his voice was not in as good shape as it had been for the first show, though the between-song patter gives many insights into his frame of mind and the motives behind Greatest Hits and the subsequent gold-suited shows.

The cover to Tom Morello's 2011 album World Wide Rebel Songs is a homage to Gunfight at Carnegie Hall.

Track listing
 "Mona Lisa" (Ray Evans, Jay Livingston) – 3:49
 "I Ain't Marching Anymore" (Phil Ochs) – 4:23
 "Okie From Muskogee" (Roy Burris, Merle Haggard) – 2:49
 "Chords of Fame" (Ochs) – 4:49
 "Buddy Holly Medley : Not Fade Away / I'm Gonna Love You Too / Think It Over / Oh, Boy! / Everyday / It's So Easy / Not Fade Away" (Charles Hardin, Norman Petty, Joe B. Mauldin, Niki Sullivan, Sonny West, Bill Tilghman, Jerry Allison) – 7:18
 "Pleasures of the Harbor" (Ochs) – 5:59
 "Tape from California" (Ochs) – 5:09
 "Elvis Medley : My Baby Left Me / Ready Teddy / Heartbreak Hotel / All Shook Up / Are You Lonesome Tonight? / My Baby Left Me" (Arthur Crudup, John Marascalco, Robert Blackwell, Jerry Leiber, Mike Stoller, Otis Blackwell, Roy Turk, Lou Handman) – 10:12
 "A Fool Such as I" (Bill Trader) – 2:00

Personnel
Phil Ochs - guitar, vocals
Bob Rafkin - guitar, backing vocals
Lincoln Mayorga - piano
Kenny Kaufman - bass, backing vocals
Kevin Kelley - drums

See also
 Jim Glover

References

Notes

Footnotes

External links

Phil Ochs live albums
1975 live albums
A&M Records live albums
Albums recorded at Carnegie Hall